Vladimir Kolupaev (born September 17, 1964, Mesherskoye, Chekhovsky District, Russia) is a historian, Doctor of Historical Sciences, a graduate of the Moscow State Art and Cultural University and Catholic priest.

Biography

Since 1989, Kolupaev has been a monk named Rostislav, ordained in 1989 an Orthodox priest, but in 2004 moved to Catholicism, joining the UGCC Ukrainian Catholic Archeparchy of Lviv.

Kolupaev has various topics of scientific interest: history, culture and religious life of Russian abroad. Historical subjects taught in Moscow, Kaluga, Obninsk and Novosibirsk. He is the author of several books and research papers in Russian and foreign publications, member of national and international scientific conferences. Member of the International Scientific Committee and the Italian edition of the magazine La Nuova Europa.
He is also a member of editorial board of scientific and educational journal "Studia Humanitatis" .
He works at the Christian Russia centre in Seriate, Italy.

Kolupaev is a of a database " Personalità: Martiri - Chiesa cattolica, Confessori DELLA Fede - Chiesa cattolica "

He also works as a spiritual assistant to the international movement "Mothers Prayers"

Scholarship

PhD thesis: "Russians in North Africa 1920 - 1998."

Doctoral thesis: "Publishing activities of the Russian Orthodox Church Abroad in the 20th century."

Brussels publishing " Life with God ": Book World Russians abroad in the 20th century . Radiomissiya for Soviet listeners. Monograph. Saarbrücken: LAP Lambert Academic Publishing GmbH & Co., 2012 . 336 p., Ill.  UDC 002.2 (470 493) 325.2 (470) BBK 76.17 +86.3 to 61 Scientific Publication

"Life of Bishop Paul Meleteva : Serving Church and Homeland in Russia , in the Soviet Union and abroad . " Monograph. Saarbrücken: LAP Lambert Academic Publishing GmbH & Co., 2012 . 125 s., Ill. , 

Orthodox book Russians abroad in the first half of the 20th century : the history of the printing fraternity Job Pochaev, Volyn  - Carpathians, 1903  - 1944 . Monograph. M .: Publisher "Pashkov House", 2010 . 272 p., Ill.  Scientific Publication

Russians in the Maghreb . Monograph. M .: Publisher "Pashkov House", 2009 . 415. ill.  Scientific Publication

Russian Church's presence in China, the Byzantine Rite Catholic Exarchate in Harbin 1928 - 1949. Monograph. 2013. p. 122.  Scientific Publication

References

 Oriental collection of Vatican / / Oriental Collection . M . 2008, number 4 . with. 135-142. 
 Remembering India / / Oriental Collection . M . 2008, 3 (34) . pp. 145–149.
 "Doctor Zhivago" in the book collections of the Russian emigration / / Bibliography. M . 2008, № 4. pp. 151–155.
 Documents on the history of the Church in the meeting of Italian center «Russia Cristiana» in Seriate / / Proceedings of the International Conference "Modern Problems of studying the history of the Church", "Moscow State University. Lomonosov, November 7, 2011 , the M .: MSU, 2011.
 The life of the Russian community in Brazil in light of the newspaper "friends and acquaintances" / / Latin America. M . 2011, № 3. pp. 1 – 9.
 Publisher Chekhov in New York / / Bibliography. M . 2009, № 4. pp. 140–143.
 Study of Book Culture Russian Orthodox abroad in the 20th century in domestic science / / Book: studies and materials. Part 1. M .: Nauka, 2009 . pp. 477–479.
 Joseph Germanovich in the book world of Russian and Belarusian foreign / / Zdabytki: dakumentalnyya pomniki on Belarusi / Natsyyanalnaya bіblіyateka of Belarus; skladalnіkі: LG Kіruhіna, KV Land. Minsk: Natsyyanalnaya bіblіyateka of Belarus, 2010 . No. 12. 287.
 Chronology Russian abroad: Information arrays in the English-speaking university system / / Auxiliary Historical Disciplines in the space of human knowledge: Proceedings of the XXI Conference. M ., 2009 . pp. 215–217.
Mental and socio-cultural picture of the life of Russian Catholics in Paris in the XX century. / / Yearbook of historical and anthropological research in 2010 . M .: Publisher of "economy-Inform", in 2010 . pp. 64 – 73.
Jesuit mission of Russian emigrants in Argentina in XX century / / Latin America. M . 2011, № 8. C.

The monastery on the island of San Lazzaro / / Oriental Collection. M . 2011, № 2 (45)

Musical-liturgical documents in the history of Russian abroad XX Century / / Book: studies and materials. Sat 91, Part 1 - II. M .: Nauka, 2009 . with. 178-194.

About Russian-Bulgarian relations book / / Nikolova MS Russian book in Bulgaria ( e878  - 1912 ). [Monograph]. M .: Publisher "Pashkov House" , 2010 . 160.

On the study of the documentary heritage izdatestva "Life with God" (Brussels) / / Historiography of sources and auxiliary historical disciplines: materials XXII International Conference, Moscow, 28–30 January 2010, the M .: RSUH, 2010 . pp. 257–259.

Domestic science and the problem of studying the Orthodox Book Culture of the Russian diaspora XX century / / Libraries and scientific communities: the interaction and mutual influence: Rumyantsev Readings : Proceedings of International. scientific. Conf. (19–21 April 2011 ). M .: Publishing house "Pashkov House" , 2011.

Defending their identity / / Oriental Collection. M ., 2008, № 1 (32). pp. 123–128.

Work MA Taube for Byzantine studies in the Russian Diaspora in XX. / / Russian Byzantine: Traditions and Prospects. Abstracts of the XIX All-Russian Scientific Session of Byzantine Studies. M .: Moscow University Publishing House, 2011 . with. 122-124.

Russian-Vatican relations in the twentieth century: the new instruments of the Russian Diaspora / / Modern Europe: The Journal of Public Policy Research. M . 2011, № 3. pp. 106–111.
Russian artists Leonid and Rimma Brailovsky in Russia and Rome / / Russian in Italy. Italians in Russia: the interaction of cultures. St. Petersburg: Civil Engineering, 2012. with. 50 - 78. 

Russian Catholics in Harbin (20 th ─ 30 years of the twentieth century) / / Far East. M . 2012, № 2.

Russian book collection in the collection of the Italian center «Russia Cristiana» / / Bibligrafiya. M . 2011, № 5 (September - October). pp. 122–126: 3 ph.

Russian traits in Brazil during the second half of XX century / / Yearbook of historical and anthropological studies of 2011 / 2012 / PFUR. M .: Izdatelsstvo "Econ-Inform" 2012 .

References

External links
 http://sottoosservazione.wordpress.com/2009/06/24/la-%E2%80%9Ccechov%E2%80%9D-russia-made-in-usa/
 http://www.russiacristiana.org/
 http://www.russiacristiana.org/martiri/approfondimenti.html
 http://www.mothersprayers.org/
 http://www.rkcvo.ru/node/389

Converts to Eastern Catholicism from Eastern Orthodoxy
Russian Eastern Catholics
Former Russian Orthodox Christians
1964 births
Living people